Soft Dogs is an album by Danish rock group D-A-D. The album was released on 20 February 2002. The album gained many favorable reviews, including six out of six stars by Danish music magazine Gaffa.

Track listing

Soft Dogs - 4:30
What's the Matter? - 4:57
The Truth About You - 4:12
Golden Way - 4:37
So What? - 4:40
Between You and Me - 3:22
Out There - 3:30
It Changes Everything - 3:31
Un Frappe Sur la Tête - 2:59
Blue All Over - 4:17
Hey Little Airplane - 3:19
Human Kind - 4:02

To date the album has sold 65,000+ copies in Denmark.

Charts

References

External links
 This album on D-A-D's official homepage

2002 albums
Albums produced by Nick Foss
D.A.D. (band) albums